Clinton Bradley David Bell (born March 18, 1983 in Davison, Michigan), known professionally as Bradley Bell, is an American keyboardist, pianist, synthesist, and backing vocalist, best known for being the keyboardist of post-hardcore band Chiodos, and also for being the keyboardist of pop punk band Cinematic Sunrise until their demise, and the keyboardist of experimental band The Sound of Animals Fighting. He was also in a pop punk band called Still No Sign, where he was the lead vocalist. Chiodos guitarist Pat McManaman was also in this band.

Musical career

Still No Sign and Cinematic Sunrise (2000–2009) 
Bell was the lead vocalist, along with members Pat McManaman, and two other members named Matt and Chad, of a pop punk band called Still No Sign. The band released one EP, literally entitled The EP, but disbanded in 2001 so Bell and McManaman could move on to Chiodos.

Bell was the keyboardist of pop punk band Cinematic Sunrise, along with Craig Owens, Underminded frontman Nick Martin, and the Agency Group manager Dave Shapiro. He was featured on their first and only EP, A Coloring Storybook and Long Playing Record. During the band's last six shows, Bell was absent from all of them, presumably because of bad terms between him and Owens.

Chiodos (2001–present) 
Bell is the only keyboardist to ever be in post-hardcore band Chiodos, previously known as the Chiodos Bros. Bell has been featured on every release by the band so far, except for their debut EP, The Chiodos Bros. In an interview with Double Dance, Bell was asked about the origin of the title and the concept behind Chiodos' most recent release, Illuminaudio. In response, Bell stated that

Bell was also asked about the chemistry of the band after the departure of vocalist Craig Owens and the arrival of Brandon Bolmer. He answered that

He also said that he would like to keep touring and do overseas touring as well.

In another interview question about Owens with Review Rinse Repeat, Bell was asked about what exactly made Chiodos remove Owens. Bell answered with

Later in the interview, he was asked about the decision to attempt to keep Brandon Bolmer's position as lead vocalist a secret. He answered that Chiodos was

Discography 
with Still No Sign
The EP (Self-released, 2001)

with Chiodos
The Best Way to Ruin Your Life (Self-released, 2002)
The Heartless Control Everything (Self-released, 2003)
All's Well That Ends Well (Equal Vision Records, 2005)
Bone Palace Ballet (Equal Vision Records, 2007)
Illuminaudio (Equal Vision Records, 2010)
Devil (Razor & Tie, 2014) 

with Cinematic Sunrise
A Coloring Storybook and Long Playing Record (Equal Vision Records, 2008)

References 

1983 births
Living people
People from Davison, Michigan
Musicians from Michigan
Chiodos members
The Sound of Animals Fighting members
Cinematic Sunrise members
21st-century American keyboardists